Lulakabad-e Olya (also Romanized as Lūlakābād-e ‘Olyā; also known as Lūlīkābād-e Bālā, Lūlīkābād-e ‘Olyā, and Lūlīk-e ‘Olyā) is a village in Chahriq Rural District, Kuhsar District, Salmas County, West Azerbaijan Province, Iran. At the 2006 census, its population was 82, in 15 families.

References 

Populated places in Salmas County